Page is Korean pop project group. Maronnier member Kim Seon Min did write lyrics for various Page songs.

Members
 Oh Hyun Ran (오현란, vocals, 1995)
 An Sang Ye (안상예, vocals, 1997-1999)
 Lee Ga Eun (이가은, vocals, 2002-)

Discography

Albums
 마지막 너를 보내며, 1997
 2 Page, 1997
 Dear, 1998
 Blue Note, 1999
 Love Is Blue, 2002
 Quella Ragazza e Un Sogno, April 2003
 She Is, November 2004

Compilations 
 Unforgettable, February 2006

References

External links
 Page in maniadb.com
 Page in Yahoo Music Korea

K-pop music groups